In mathematics, a Somos sequence is a sequence of numbers defined by a certain recurrence relation, described below.  They were discovered by mathematician Michael Somos. From the form of their defining recurrence (which involves division), one would expect the terms of the sequence to be fractions, but nevertheless many Somos sequences have the property that all of their members are integers.

Recurrence equations
For an integer number k larger than 1, the Somos-k sequence  is defined by the equation

when k is odd, or by the analogous equation

when k is even, together with the initial values
 ai = 1 for i < k.

For k = 2 or 3, these recursions are very simple (there is no addition on the right-hand side) and they define the all-ones sequence (1, 1, 1, 1, 1, 1, ...).  In the first nontrivial case, k = 4, the defining equation is

while for k = 5 the equation is

These equations can be rearranged into the form of a recurrence relation, in which the value an on the left hand side of the recurrence is defined by a formula on the right hand side, by dividing the formula by an − k. For k = 4, this yields the recurrence

while for k = 5 it gives the recurrence

While in the usual definition of the Somos sequences, the values of ai for i < k are all set equal to 1, it is also possible to define other sequences by using the same recurrences with different initial values.

Sequence values
The values in the Somos-4 sequence are
1, 1, 1, 1, 2, 3, 7, 23, 59, 314, 1529, 8209, 83313, 620297, 7869898, ... .
The values in the Somos-5 sequence are
1, 1, 1, 1, 1, 2, 3, 5, 11, 37, 83, 274, 1217, 6161, 22833, 165713, ... .
The values in the Somos-6 sequence are
1, 1, 1, 1, 1, 1, 3, 5, 9, 23, 75, 421, 1103, 5047, 41783, 281527, ... .
The values in the Somos-7 sequence are
1, 1, 1, 1, 1, 1, 1, 3, 5, 9, 17, 41, 137, 769, 1925, 7203, 34081, ... .

Integrality
The form of the recurrences describing the Somos sequences involves divisions, making it appear likely that the sequences defined by these recurrence will contain fractional values. Nevertheless, for k ≤ 7 the Somos sequences contain only integer values. Several mathematicians have studied the problem of proving and explaining this integer property of the Somos sequences; it is closely related to the combinatorics of cluster algebras.

For k ≥ 8 the analogously defined sequences eventually contain fractional values. For Somos-8 the first fractional value is the 19th term with value 420514/7.  

For k < 7, changing the initial values (but using the same recurrence relation) also typically results in fractional values.

References

External links
Jim Propp's Somos Sequence Site

The Troublemaker Number. Numberphile video on the Somos sequences
Integer sequences
Recurrence relations